RAAF Base Curtin, also sometimes RAAF Curtin  is a joint use Royal Australian Air Force (RAAF) military air base and civil airport located  southeast of the town of Derby on the north coast of Western Australia in Australia. As it is one of the RAAF's three bare bases, no RAAF units are permanently based at Curtin and it is maintained by a small caretaker staff during peacetime.

The base is named in honour of former Prime Minister John Curtin.

History
RAAF Curtin was the first new major military airfield to be built in Australia since World War II. Construction on the base began in 1983 and it was opened on 11 June 1988. The  base was activated twice by the RAAF between 1988 and 2013. It was activated again in 2016 as part of Exercise Northern Shield.

From the late 1990s the base operated as Curtin Immigration Reception and Processing Centre, an Australian Government immigration detention centre, which closed in September 2002. However the centre was reopened in April 2010 to house around sixty Sri Lankan and Afghan asylum seekers whose applications were suspended.

In 2007 direct flights recommenced between Perth and Derby (RAAF Curtin) for the first time since Ansett Australia stopped the service in 1992. However, the flights ceased in February 2016.

In 2016 and 2017 the Australian Government announced that facilities at Curtin would receive a A$100 to A$200 million upgrade, in addition to a range of other defence facilities in Western Australia.

Climate

See also
List of airports in Western Australia
List of Royal Australian Air Force installations

References

Royal Australian Air Force bases
Kimberley airports
Immigration to Australia
Airports established in 1988
Curtin
Curtin
Military installations in Western Australia